Fairmont Historic District may refer to:

Fairmont Avenue Historic District, Zanesville, Ohio, listed on the National Register of Historic Places in Muskingum County, Ohio
Fairmont Downtown Historic District, Fairmont, West Virginia, listed on the National Register of Historic Places in Marion County, West Virginia

See also
Fairmount Historic District (disambiguation)